The history of conflicts involving the Texas Military spans over two centuries, from 1823 to present, under the command authority (the ultimate source of lawful military orders) of four governments including the Texas governments (3), American government, Mexican government, and Confederate government.

Since 1823, Texas forces have undergone many re-designations and reorganizations. For example, the Texas Rangers were a branch of the Texas Military Forces from 1823 to 1935 providing cavalry, special operations, and military police capabilities. Administrative control (ADCON) of the Texas Rangers was transferred from the Texas Military Department to the Texas Department of Public Safety (DPS) in 1935 where they now perform duties similar to the Federal Bureau of Investigation (FBI) for Texas as a State Bureau of Investigation (SBI). The following list of conflicts reflects duty at the time as a military unit.

Conflicts in this list may apply to several categories, but they've been generally organized by the preponderance of the mission. For example, the Laredo Smallpox Riot was a civil disorder and emergency management conflict, and Operation Border Star is both a border control and counter-drug conflict.

List Key 
Casualty key: KIA = killed in action, WIA = wounded in action, MIA = missing in action, DIA = deserted in action, POW = prisoner of war

Outcome key: Conventional Warfare / Low-intensity Conflict = Strategic, Tactical, Moral, Pyrrhic victory or loss. Military Operations Other Than War: accomplished or failure.

Texas governments 
This list includes conflicts under the command authority of the Colony of Texas, Republic of Texas, and State of Texas.

Legal Authority 
As a colony in Mexico from 1823 to 1835, the Texas Military was legally empowered by Agustín de Iturbide and the Coahuila y Tejas legislature to "organize the colonists into a body of militia to preserve tranquility." Operations were conducted under command of Stephen F. Austin.

As a sovereign republic from 1835 to 1845, the Texas Military was legally empowered by Article 1 of the Consultation and Article 2, Section 6 of Constitution of the Republic of Texas "to execute the law, to suppress insurrections, and repel invasion." Operations were conducted under command of the War Department and Adjutant General Department.

As a state of America from 1845–present, the Texas Military is legally empowered by Title 32 of the United States Code and Article 4, Section 7 of the Constitution of the State of Texas to "execute the laws of the state, to suppress insurrections, and to repel invasions". Operations are conducted under command of the Adjutant General Department and Texas Military Department.

Conflicts

Border control

Note: These conflicts are commanded by the Texas government. For related conflicts commanded by the American government, see Border control.

Civil disorder / Insurrection

Counterdrug

Note: These conflicts are commanded by the Texas government. For related conflicts commanded by the American government, see War on Drugs.

Covert

Emergency management

Expedition

Guerrilla

Humanitarian

Invasion / Incursion

Revolution

United States of America government 
This list includes conflicts under the command authority of the United States of America.

Legal Authority 
Title 10 of the United States Code legally empowers the United States government to mobilize Texas Military Forces when more resources are needed than available in the United States Armed Forces for war, national emergency, or national security. Operations are conducted under command of the United States Department of Defense.

Conflicts

Border control 

Note: These conflicts are commanded by the American government. For related conflicts commanded by the Texas government, see Border control.

International security

Mexican War 
Note: These conflicts are commanded by the American government. For related conflicts commanded by the Texas government, see Invasions / Incursions.

American Civil War

Spanish War

Philippine War

Mexican Border War 
Note: These conflicts are commanded by the American government. For related conflicts commanded by the Texas government, see Invasions / Incursions.

World War I

World War II

Cold War

War on Drugs 

Note: These conflicts are commanded by the American government. For related conflicts commanded by the Texas government, see Counterdrug.

Gulf War

War on Terror

United Mexican States government 
This list includes conflicts under the command authority of the United Mexican States (First Mexican Republic) government.

Legal Authority 
Faculty 18 and 19, Section 5, Title 3 of the 1824 Constitution of Mexico legally empowered the First Mexican Republic government to mobilize Texas Military Forces. Operations were conducted under command of the Mexican Army.

Conflicts

Confederate States of America government 
This list includes conflicts under the command authority of the Confederate States of America.

Legal Authority 
The First, Second, and Third Conscription Acts of the 1st Confederate States Congress legally empowered the Confederate States government to mobilize Texas Military Forces. Operations were conducted under command of the Confederate States War Department.

Conflicts

American Civil War 
Note: These conflicts are commanded by the Confederate government. For related conflicts commanded by the Texas government, see Invasions / Incursions.

See also 
 Texas Military Forces
 Texas Military Department
Awards and decorations of the Texas Military
List of armed conflicts involving the United States

References 

Texas Military Forces
Texas Military Department